George Donald Seasholtz (November 14, 1900 – April 11, 1945) was a fullback in the National Football League. He first played with the Milwaukee Badgers during the 1922 NFL season. After a year away from the NFL, he played with the Kenosha Maroons during the 1924 NFL season.

References

External links

People from Pottstown, Pennsylvania
Milwaukee Badgers players
Kenosha Maroons players
American football fullbacks
Lafayette Leopards football players
1900 births
1945 deaths
Players of American football from Pennsylvania